Tubulin alpha-1C chain is a protein that in humans is encoded by the TUBA1C gene.

References

Further reading